Railway Children is a 2016 Indian Kannada feature film written and directed by Prithvi Konanur. It is inspired from Rescuing Railway Children written by  Lalitha Iyer and Malcolm Harper that describes the lives of children that run away from their homes, live in railway stations and trains, and grow up as criminals, despite their intentions being harmless and seeking only to earn a living.

Produced by TinDrum Beats, the film featured mostly non-actors. The plot revolves around a 12-year-old runaway who falls into the hands of a gang involved in illegal businesses. Manohara K., Syed Pervez, Yash Shetty, Divya M. R., Karthik and Parimala appear in lead roles. The film premiered at the Mumbai International Film Festival in October 2016. Manohara won the National Film Award for Best Child Artist and Karnataka State Film Award for Best Child Actor (Male) for his performance. The film was also named the Second Best Film at the 2016 Karnataka State Film Awards.

Cast 

 Mahonara K. as Jollu
 Yash Shetty as Solution
 Syed Pervez as Pappu
 Karthik as Karthik
 Srikanth as Railway child
 Vj Shetty as a Police inspector
 Hanumant Raju as Railway child
 Divya M. R. as Divya
 Satish Acharya
 Naresh as phone booth owner
 Parimala as Raju
 Manjunath as Police Constable
 Narasappa as Jollu's father
 Akash	as Railway child
 Ramesh Babua as ticket collector
 Basavaraju as beggar
 Chinnu as new recruit
 Mangala as Jollu's mother
 Jyothi as NGO worker
 Ramachandra Hosur as tea stall owner

Production
Railway Children was produced through crowdfunding by Tindrum Beats, a film production company based in Udupi. The film was also supported by Don Thompson (producer, playwright) through NextPix/FirstPix grant.

Soundtrack 
Chandan Shetty scored the film's music and for its soundtrack. The soundtrack was released on YouTube.

Release and reception 
The film premiered at the Jio Mami Mumbai film Festival on 23 October 2016 where it competed for the Golden Gateway award. It was reported that it would also be screened at the European Film festival before releasing theatrically in India.

The film was released in select multiplexes and single screen cinema halls in major cities in Karnataka on 22 December 2017.

The film was met with critical acclaim. Wishberry.in included it among the 9 brilliant Indian films of 2016 

DUBeat included it in the 5 must-watch movies of Mumbai Film Festival 

Bangalore Mirror gave 4 out of 5 wrote "for US-returned techie-turned-director Prithvi has lent it the mature tone while retaining the suspense till the end whose parallel can best be seen in some of the Iranian flicks."

Kannadaprabha, a Kannada daily gave 4 out of 4 calling it a must-watch, and wrote in Kannada "The film has the ability to engage you and disturb you at the same time."

Times of India gave 3.5 out of 5 and wrote " this film unwinds in its own leisurely pace, offering a strikingly real and scary peek into the lives of children who run away from homes and live near railway stations."

Accolades 

64th National Film Awards
 Winner National Film Award for Best Child Artist — Manohara K.

2016 Karnataka State Film Awards
 Winner Second Best Film — Prithvi Konanur
 Winner Best Child Actor (Male) — Manohara K.

Mumbai Film Festival 2016
 Nominated for Golden Gateway award
 Nominated for OXFAM Best film on Gender Equality

Zlín Film Festival
 Winner Ecumenical Jury Special Mention
 Nominated for Golden Slipper Award For Best Youth Film

Asia Pacific Screen Awards
 In Competition Best Film on Youth

Asian Film Festival Barcelona
 Winner Jury Special Mention

International Film Festival of India 2017
 Selection Indian Panorama Section
 Nomination ICFT UNESCO Gandhi Medal

All Lights India International Film Festival 2017
 Winner Best Indian Film

Festival screenings 
Chicago South Asia Film Festival
Melbourne Indian Film Festival
Bangalore Queer Film Festival
Pune International Film Festival

References

External links
 

2010s Kannada-language films
Indian children's films
Child characters in film
Films set in Karnataka
Rail transport films
Drama films based on actual events
Films based on Indian novels
Indian docudrama films
Films scored by Chandan Shetty